Rhomboid family member 2 is a protein that in humans is encoded by the RHBDF2 gene. The alternative name iRhom2 has been proposed, in order to clarify that it is a catalytically inactive member of the rhomboid family of intramembrane serine proteases.

The RHBDF2 gene is located on the long arm of chromosome 17 (17q25.1) on the Crick (minus) strand. It is 30.534 kilobases in length and encodes a protein of 856 amino acids with a predicted molecular weight of 96.686 kiloDaltons.

The RHBDF2 protein plays an important role in the secretion of tumor necrosis factor alpha, and has also been implicated in familial esophageal cancer.

It is involved in the regulation of the secretion of several ligands of the epidermal growth factor receptor.

References

Further reading